Boris Labar (born 1947) is a Croatian physician and scientist in the field of hematology and hematopoietic stem cell transplantation.

Education and career
Labar received doctor of medicine degree in 1970 from the University of Zagreb School of Medicine. In the period from 1972 until 1976 he underwent specialization in internal medicine. In 1977, he took up the position of Assistant Professor at the Department of Internal Medicine at the University of Zagreb School of Medicine. In 1982 he received his Ph.D. degree from the University of Zagreb School of Medicine after defending the thesis entitled Pyruvate kinase in acute leukemia.

In 1982 Labar with his team established the first bone marrow transplant (or HCT) program in South-Eastern Europe, at a time when such centers were rare even in the most developed countries. From 1985-2012 Dr. Labar was the Head of the Division of Hematology. From 2000-2004 he was the Dean of the University of Zagreb School of Medicine. In 2005 he became Full Professor of Medicine at the aforementioned institution.  In 2012 Dr. Labar retired from the University of Zagreb Medical Center “Rebro”. He continues to actively practice medicine in the private sector, currently at the Zagreb clinic Center for Expert Medicine.

His research area is hematology, acute leukemia and lymphoma, with a focus on intensive chemotherapy and stem cell transplantation.  Since 1974 Labar has published more than 405 scholarly articles, of which more than 100 appeared in Current Contents (CC) cited journals, with over 2000 citations.

International cooperation 

Labar played a pivotal role in engaging Croatian hematology with the world. This process started in 1987 with the meeting “New Trends in Acute leukemia”, which he and his colleagues organized in Dubrovnik jointly with the European School of Oncology. For many years the Division of Hematology at the University of Zagreb has participated as a core member in the clinical trials of the European Organization for Research and Treatment of Cancer (EORTC) Leukemia Group. He and his team were also engaged in the European Blood and Marrow Transplant (EBMT) Acute Leukemia Working Party.  During his mandate as Dean of the University of Zagreb School of Medicine (2000-2004), Dr. Labar introduced the first graduate curriculum in English language open to international candidates.

In 2009  Labar led the initiative resulting in the establishment of the Central and Eastern European Leukemia Group (CELG). He started and co-chaired the internationally renowned Leukemia and Lymphoma meeting “East meets West” in Croatia in September 2007 and 2011, which was organized in collaboration with the MD Anderson Cancer Center (Houston, Texas). For these services and his achievements in the international arena, in 2013 Dr. Boris Labar received the prestigious Center for International Blood and Marrow Transplant Research (CIBMTR) Distinguished Service Award.

Personal life 
Labar lives in Zagreb. He is married and has two sons.

References

External links
 Boris Labar at the "Who is Who in Croatian Science"

1947 births
Croatian hematologists
People from Zadar
Living people